Osmolytes are low-molecular weight organic compounds that influence the properties of biological fluids. Their primary role is to maintain the integrity of cells by affecting the viscosity, melting point, and ionic strength of the aqueous solution. When a cell swells due to external osmotic pressure, membrane channels open and allow efflux of osmolytes which carry water with them, restoring normal cell volume. Osmolytes also interact with the constituents of the cell, e.g. they influence protein folding. Common osmolytes include amino acids, sugars and polyols, methylamines, methylsulfonium compounds, and urea.

Case studies
Natural osmolytes that can act as osmoprotectants include trimethylamine N-oxide (TMAO), dimethylsulfoniopropionate, sarcosine, betaine, glycerophosphorylcholine, myo-inositol, taurine, glycine, and others. Remarkably, TMAO has the capacity to restore glucocorticoid binding to mutant receptors. Bacteria accumulate osmolytes for protection against a high osmotic environment.  The osmolytes will be neutral non-electrolytes, except in bacteria that can tolerate salts.  In humans, osmolytes are of particular importance in the renal medulla. Current understanding of osmolytes have been used to calculate the maximum depth where a fish can survive: .

References

Further reading

Diffusion
Solutions